Charles Édouard Delort (February 4, 1841 – 1895) was a French academic painter who was born in Nimes, France.  He grew up in the area around Bordeaux, and entered the naval Academy at 12 years of age.  In 1859, he moved to Paris, where he studied with Jean-Léon Gérôme and with Marc-Charles-Gabriel Gleyre.

References
 Bénézit, Emmanuel, Bénézit Dictionary of Artists, English Edition, Paris, Gründ, 2006, Vol. 4, 677.

External links
 es_edouard.html Charles Édouard Delort in ArtCyclopedia
 Charles Edouard Edmond Delort (French, 1841-1895) Oil on Canvas Laid on Wood Titled An Invitation to The Royal Ball.
 Charles Edouard Edmond Delort (French, 1841-1895)  Oil on Canvas Game for the Cardinal

Gallery

19th-century French painters
French male painters
Anti-clerical art
1841 births
1895 deaths
19th-century French male artists